The Niagara Purple Eagles women's basketball team is the college basketball team that represent Niagara University in Lewiston, New York, United States. The school's team currently competes in the Metro Atlantic Athletic Conference.

History
Niagara began play in 1974. They joined the MAAC in 1989. They have never made the NCAA tournament. Their brief achievements came in regional AIAWs, such as winning the New York AIAW Championship in 1978 and 1980 and the Eastern AIAW in 1979, with a Third Place finish in the AIAW Small College tournament. They made it to the ECAC North title game in 1986, losing to St. Anslem's 77–65 and lost to Saint Peter's 66–38 in the 1997 MAAC title game. They have reached the second round of the MAAC tournament numerous times but have never won it. As of the end of the 2015–16 season, the Purple Eagles have an all-time record of 456–575. In 2023 Niagara made history by reaching the WNIT tournament for the first time in program history. The Purple Eagles would ultimately fall to Green Bay in their first appearance in the tournament ending one of the best seasons in the history of Niagara women's basketball.

Postseason

AIAW College Division/Division II
The Purple Eagles made two appearances in the AIAW National Division II Basketball Tournament, with a combined record of 3–2.

WNIT results 
The Purple Eagles have appeared in 1 Women's National Invitation Tournament.

Roster

References

External links